Trnovo is a settlement in the Municipality of Laško in eastern Slovenia. It lies in hills above the right bank of the Savinja River east of Sedraž. The area is part of the traditional region of Styria. It is now included with the rest of the municipality in the Savinja Statistical Region.

References

External links
Trnovo on Geopedia

Populated places in the Municipality of Laško